Norway–United Kingdom relations are foreign relations between Norway and the United Kingdom. The two nations have enjoyed very close cultural, economic, military and political cooperation since Norwegian independence in 1905. Both countries are central allies in NATO, and also have many bilateral agreements involving trade and military ties. Recently, the two have collaborated extensively to provide intelligence and arms to Ukraine during Russia's invasion of that country in 2022.

History

Historical connections

Vikings of Norwegian stock particularly settled in certain areas of modern-day Scotland and Northern England, and to this day many people in these areas carry surnames derived from Old Norse words, such as Ainscough, or are of partial Norwegian descent.

In England, Norwegian Vikings began to arrive along the coast of the North West after being driven out of Ireland around the early tenth century. They are principally known for settling in The Wirral and Chester, but evidence has strongly suggested that this expulsion also led to some settling in nearby West Derby Hundred (today split between Greater Manchester and Merseyside), Amounderness Hundred and Lonsdale Hundred in Lancashire. The Vikings were able to settle comfortably in these areas, as they were sparsely populated at that time. Many place names in this area, such as North Meols, Scholes, Skelmersdale and Grimsargh are of Old Norse origin, as are certain words in Lancashire dialect from this area, such as "skrike". The Cuerdale Hoard and Silverdale Hoard were both discovered within this area. Around the same time, Norwegian Vikings moved on to settle in the area that today is Cumbria.

In Scotland, the islands of Shetland and Orkney have longstanding historical and cultural connections with Norway.

1900s
Both countries established diplomatic relations in 1905, after Norwegian independence from Sweden. The UK has an embassy in Oslo, and Norway has an embassy in London. Relations, however, go as far back as the Viking Age when Norse Vikings raided the British Isles, founding permanent settlements in the west of England, the Isle of Man, the Hebrides in Scotland and the islands of Orkney and Shetland. As a result, the English language has been greatly influenced by the Norwegian language. This cultural bond has persisted to this day, resulting in a close cultural relationship between the two countries.

With Norway's complete independence from Sweden, the question arose as to a king for Norway. The choice of Prince Carl of Denmark, who became King Haakon VII, was largely seen as being influenced by two unusual factors: Denmark being a smaller nation meant that the Balance of Power in Europe would not be upset by Norway's instant alliance with the native land of its new king, and Carl's wife, Maud, was a British princess, which would be expected to lead to a close relationship with the United Kingdom, which could give Norway some protection from German hegemony.

During World War I, Norway was neutral. However, due to largely favouring the British over the Germans, Norway came to be known as The Neutral Ally.

World War II

During World War II, Norway was invaded and occupied by Germany, forcing the Norwegian king and government to create a government-in-exile in London. The British military also helped train and organise Norwegian commandos to attack Nazi installations in Norway. As a token of appreciation from the Norwegian people to the people of Britain, a Norwegian Christmas Tree is sent every year from Oslo to Trafalgar Square in London.

Each year for the last sixty years, Newcastle upon Tyne has received a Christmas tree as a gift from the people of Bergen, one of Newcastle's twin cities. The impressive Norwegian spruce, standing at 45 feet tall, was personally felled by Gunnar Bakke who has been the Mayor of Bergen since September 2007. Each year the tree is decorated in traditional Norwegian white lights and is a symbol of peace and goodwill.
The people of Norway also send a tree to the town of Great Grimsby every Christmas since the end of World War II, for the past few years the tree has been selected by the people of Sortland.

Brexit
In January 2020, with the imminent departure of Britain from the European Union, Norway and the UK signed an exclusive Brexit agreement between the two countries that would aim to maintain existing guarantees for citizens of either.

In April 2021, negotiations on a bilateral agreement on fishing rights failed to reach an agreement.

In June 2021, the two countries signed a trade deal.

Modern Day

After the English town of Harwich was badly affected by the North Sea Flood of 1953, in which several people were made homeless, the Norwegian Government responded by funding the building of some wooden houses in the town. Despite being considered temporary, the houses still stand in Harwich today.

Norway and the U.K. share mutual border boundary lines in Antarctica, and mutually recognise each other's claims as well as those of Australia, France and New Zealand.

Both countries are full members of NATO and of the Council of Europe.  There are around 18,000 Norwegians living in the United Kingdom and around 13,395 British people living in Norway. British people are one of the largest immigrant groups in many cities.  The cities with the most Britons are Oslo (2,535), Stavanger (1,542), Bergen (1,014), Bærum (716), Trondheim (360), Asker (307), Kristiansand (238), Drammen (144) and Fredrikstad (111).

Queen Elizabeth II made three state visits to Norway during her reign, in 1955, 1981 and most recently in 2001 when she was received by King Harald V.

Military relations

The Royal Marines train annually in Norway, and are integrated into Norway's defense plans. In March 2023, the UK opened a new military base in Norway, named Camp Viking.

Gallery
Gallery

See also 
Foreign relations of Norway
Foreign relations of the United Kingdom
List of diplomats from the United Kingdom to Norway
Trafalgar Square Christmas tree
Anglo-Norse Society in London
Gunboat War

References

Further reading
 Almlid, Geir K. Britain and Norway in Europe Since 1945: Outsiders (Springer Nature, 2020).
 Barnes, Richard. "United Kingdom/Norway: Framework Agreement on Fisheries between the United Kingdom of Great Britain and Northern Ireland and the Kingdom of Norway." International Journal of Marine and Coastal Law 36.1 (2021): 155-164.
 Garau, Salvatore. Fascism and Ideology: Italy, Britain, and Norway (Routledge, 2015) online.
 Lucas, Colin. "Great Britain and the Union of Norway and Sweden." Scandinavian Journal of History 15.3-4 (1990): 269-278.
 Nelsen, Brent F. "Explaining Petroleum Policy in Britain and Norway, 1962‐90." Scandinavian political studies 15.4 (1992): 307-328. online
 Riste, Olav. "Britain and Norway: from War to Cold War, 1944–1951." Scandinavian journal of history 37.2 (2012): 164-170.
 Wilkins, William Henry. A Queen of Tears: Caroline Matilda, Queen of Denmark and Norway and Princess of Great Britain and Ireland  (Longmans, Green, and Company, 1904) online.

 
United Kingdom
Bilateral relations of the United Kingdom